John R. Smith (born December 29, 1945) is a politician from Leesville, Louisiana, who is  a Republican former member of the Louisiana State Senate for District 30.

In 2010, Smith switched from Democratic to Republican party affiliation.

Background

Smith received both his Bachelor of Science and Master of Business Administration degrees from the Roman Catholic Loyola University in New Orleans. 

Smith is also a former member of the Vernon Parish Police Jury and was the jury president from 1980 to 1983. Those same years, he also served on the Louisiana Democratic State Central Committee.

Smith and his wife, the former Pamela Arnondin, have a son and a daughter, Bradford Smith and Payton Smith John, the wife of former United States Representative Chris John of Louisiana's 7th congressional district, since disbanded.

Legislative matters

Thereafter, Smith was unopposed for the House in 1995, 1999, and 2003.

Smith chairs the Senate Commerce, Consumer Protection, and International Affairs Committee. He is a member of on the Incentive Program Review Subcommittee of the Joint Budget Committee.

2011 election

In his bid for a second term in the general election held on November 19, 2011, Smith defeated his predecessor in the office, James David Cain. Smith received 8,457 votes (59.4 percent) to Cain's 5,772 (40.6 percent).
 
Smith carried the backing of Governor Bobby Jindal. In the primary held on October 22, 2011, he led a three-candidate field with 9,808 votes (45.6 percent). Cain trailed with 6,343 (29.5 percent). Democrat Terry Fowler held the remaining but critical 5,370 votes (25 percent).

Notes

1945 births
Living people
Loyola University New Orleans alumni
Louisiana Democrats
Louisiana Republicans
Louisiana state senators
Members of the Louisiana House of Representatives
Louisiana local politicians
People from Leesville, Louisiana
Businesspeople from Louisiana
21st-century American politicians